Regunathapuram is a small village in Karambakkudi taluk, Pudukkottai District in the Indian state of Tamil Nadu.

Transport 
Regunathapuram is connected by the road to Thanjavur, Karambakkudi, Pudukkottai. Frequent bus services are available to these places both by private and government carriers.

The nearest railway station is at Thanjavur.

Thattamanaippatti, Keerathur, Kalleripatti, Pudhuviduthi, Vandanviduthi are some of the closest villages to Regunathapuram.

Education 
 Government higher secondary school
 Auxilium College of Arts and Science for Women
 Auxilium College of Education for Women
 Best Catering and Nursing college.

Health care 
A primary health center, government hospital, Government Higher Secondary School and a veterinary hospital are situated in Regunathapuram. 
.

Culture 
Three major religions (Hinduism, Christianity and Islam) are practiced in Regunathapuram. Regunathapuram has three Hindu Temples, Adaikala Matha Church, St Antony's Church and a Mosque.

The annual feast at Adaikala Matha Church falls on the first Saturday of May every year. The people of Regunathapuram celebrate major festivals such as Pongal, Diwali, Christmas and Ramzan.

Economy 
Regunathapuram's economy is based on agriculture, using irrigation from bore wells and reservoirs.  The major agriculture products are rice, sugarcane, mango, coconut, blackgram, gingelly, ragi, red gram, green gram and maize.

References

Villages in Pudukkottai district